Crocus speciosus, with common name Bieberstein's crocus, is a species of flowering plant in the genus Crocus of the family Iridaceae. The plant is native to northern and central Turkey, the Caucasus,  northern Iran, Crimea.

Subspecies
 Crocus speciosus subsp. ilgazensis B.Mathew - Turkey
 Crocus speciosus subsp. speciosus - Turkey, Iran, Caucasus, Crimea
 Crocus speciosus subsp. xantholaimos B.Mathew - Sinop Province in Turkey

Description

The lilac flowers with paler coloured throats and dark veins appear in autumn (fall). The orange styles are much-divided. As it increases rapidly, this species is suitable for naturalisation in grass.

The specific epithet speciosus means "showy".

Cultivation
Crocus speciosus is cultivated as an ornamental plant.

The plant species, and the white-flowered cultivar 'Albus', have gained the Royal Horticultural Society's Award of Garden Merit.

References

External links

speciosus
Flora of the Crimean Peninsula
Garden plants of Asia
Garden plants of Europe
Plants described in 1800